Adam Paul Steinhardt (born 5 December 1969) is a retired pole vaulter from Australia, who represented his native country in two consecutive Commonwealth Games, starting in 1990. He cleared a personal best of 5.51m on 14 February 1996 in Adelaide, South Australia.

Adam Steinhardt became the managing director of Next Byte, a retail chain selling Apple macs in 1995 and left it in 2005.

In 2012 Adam Steinhardt re-entered the Apple market, starting up an Apple reseller in Adelaide, called eRepublic

In 2009 he founded The Kingdom, an Adelaide-based Advertising Agency

In 2015 The Kingdom became a Certified HubSpot Partner and won the 2015 HubSpot International Partner of the Year Award, with Adam Steinhardt as the Managing Director.

In 2016, The Kingdom became a Platinum Certified HubSpot Partner. Adam Steinhardt is a public speaker and inbound marketing professional.

Achievements

References

External links
 http://www.abc.net.au/tv/goingpublic/companies.htm
 
 
 

1969 births
Living people
Australian male pole vaulters
Athletes (track and field) at the 1990 Commonwealth Games
Athletes (track and field) at the 1994 Commonwealth Games
Commonwealth Games competitors for Australia
20th-century Australian people